The men's team squash event of the 2015 Pan American Games was held from July 14–17 at the Exhibition Centre in Toronto. The defending Pan American Games champion is  Mexico.

Schedule
All times are Central Standard Time (UTC-6).

Results

Round Robin
The round robin will be used as a qualification round. The ten teams will be split into groups of three or four. The top two teams from each group will advance to the first round of playoffs.

Pool A

Pool B

Pool C

Places 7 to 10

Playoffs

Final standings

References

External links 
 Results on squashsite.co.uk

Squash at the 2015 Pan American Games